San Juan de Manapiare is a town in the southern Venezuelan state of Amazonas.  This town is the shire town of the Manapiare Municipality and, according to the 2001 Venezuelan census, the municipality has a population of 991.

History
San Juan de Manapiare was founded by the explorer Don Melicio Pérez in the year 1940.

Demographics
The Manapiare Municipality, according to the 2001 Venezuelan census, has a population of 991 (down from 4,036 in 1990).  This amounts to 1.4% of Amazonas's population.  The municipality's population density is 0.1 people per square mile (0.0299/km2).

Government
San Juan de Manapiare is the shire town of the Manapiare Municipality in Amazonas.  The mayor of the Manapiare Municipality is Pastor Nelson Rodrìguez, elected in 2004 with 60% of the vote.  He replaced Benjamin Perez shortly after the last municipal elections in October 2004.

References

External links
manapiare-amazonas.gob.ve 
Information on the municipalities of Amazonas 

Populated places in Amazonas (Venezuelan state)